Organoargon chemistry describes the synthesis and properties of chemical compounds containing a carbon to argon chemical bond.

Very few such compounds are known. The reaction of acetylene dications with argon produced  in 2008. Reaction of the  dication with argon produced : this reaction is unique to argon among the noble gases.

The compound FArCCH has been theoretically studied and is predicted to be stable. FArCCF might also be stable enough to synthesise and detect, but probably not FArCCArF. Calculations in 2015 suggest that FArCCH and FArCH3 are stable, but not FArCN.  should be kinetically stable, as is also expected of the krypton and xenon (but not helium) analogues. HArC4H (for which the krypton analogue is known) and HArC6H have also been predicted as stable. FArCO+ and ClArCO+ should be metastable and might be possible to characterise under cryogenic conditions. Calculations suggest that HArCCF and HCCArF should be stable, and that HNgCCF molecules should be more stable than HNgCCH (Ng = Ar, Kr, Xe); the corresponding krypton species have been experimentally produced, but not the argon species despite an experimental attempt. HCCNgCN and HCCNgNC (Ng = Ar, Kr, Xe) are likewise computed to be stable, but experimental searches for them have failed.

References

Argon